Janko Kosmina (born 25 June 1935) is a Slovenian sailor. He competed in the Star event at the 1960 Summer Olympics.

References

External links
 

1935 births
Living people
Slovenian male sailors (sport)
Olympic sailors of Yugoslavia
Sailors at the 1960 Summer Olympics – Star
People from Duino-Aurisina
Sportspeople from Friuli-Venezia Giulia
20th-century Slovenian people